The ambassador of the Kingdom of England to Russia was the Kingdom of England's foremost diplomatic representative in Russia, otherwise known as Muscovy, heading the English diplomatic mission.

List of heads of mission

Ambassadors and other envoys
 1566-1567: Anthony Jenkinson Agent
 1568-1569; Thomas Randolph Special Ambassador 
 1571-1572: Anthony Jenkinson Special Ambassador
 1575-1577: Daniel Silvester Special Ambassador
 1583-1584: Sir Jerome Bowes Special Ambassador
 1586-1587: Jerome Horsey Agent
 1588-1589: Dr Giles Fletcher Special Ambassador
 1590-1591: Jerome Horsey Special Ambassador
 1598-1599: Sir Francis Cherry Special Ambassador
 1599-1600: Thomas Willis Special Ambassador (but expelled from Russia)
 1600-1601: Sir Richard Lee Special Ambassador
 1601-1602: John Merrick Special Ambassador
 1604-1605: Sir Thomas Smythe Special Ambassador
 1613: John Merrick and William Russell Special Ambassadors
 1613-1634 : Thomas Finch
 1614-1617: Sir John Merrick  Ambassador Extraordinary
 1618: Sir Dudley Digges Special Ambassador
 1620-1621: Sir John Merrick Special Ambassador
 1623-1624: Christopher Cocks Agent
 1626-1632: Fabian Smith Agent
 1633: Thomas Wyche Agent
 1633-1635: Richard Swift Agent
 1635-1640: Simon Digby Agent
 1655-1656: William Prideaux Special Ambassador
 1657: Richard Bradshaw Special Ambassador

Ambassadors Extraordinary
 1663-1665: Charles Howard, 1st Earl of Carlisle
 1667-1668: Sir John Hebdon
 1669: Sir Peter Wyche Envoy Extraordinary
 1676-1678: John Hebdon 
 1686-1687: Patrick Gordon
 1699-1712 : Charles Goodfellow Minister and Consul-General
 1704-1707: Charles Whitworth, Envoy of England and later of Great Britain, 1704-1709; later Ambassador extraordinary of Great Britain, 1709-1711 and Ambassador extraordinary and plenipotentiary of Great Britain, 1711-1712.

After the Union of England and Scotland
In 1707 the Kingdom of England became part of the new Kingdom of Great Britain. For missions from the court of St James's after 1707, see List of ambassadors of Great Britain to Russia.

References

Russia
 
England